Sir Peter George FitzGerald, 1st Baronet, 19th Knight of Kerry (15 September 1808 – 6 August 1880) was an Anglo-Irish nobleman.

Early life
Peter George FitzGerald was born on 15 September 1808 and was raised in the banking house of his maternal grandfather in Dublin. He was the eldest surviving son of the Right Hon. Sir Maurice FitzGerald, 18th Knight of Kerry (1774–1849) of Gleanleam, Valentia Island, Co Kerry and his wife Maria, the daughter of the Right Honourable David la Touche of Marlay.

Career
Sir Peter entered the civil service and was appointed Vice-Treasurer of Ireland in the last ministry of Sir Robert Peel. In 1849, he succeeded his father and resided almost constantly on Valentia Island, devoting himself to the improvement of his estates, and the welfare of his tenantry. He especially earned the thanks of the people by the erection of substantial homesteads in place of the old and poorly-maintained cabins, with which the middleman system had covered the west of Ireland. FitzGerald manifested a keen interest in all questions which had a practical bearing on the progress or prosperity of Ireland and, in contributions to The Times, he deprecated the censure which at that time and since was cast indiscriminately upon all Irish landlords.

His own admirable personal qualities, his hatred of abuses, his engaging manners, and his generous nature, made him a great favourite with the Irish peasantry. His hospitality at Glanleam was enjoyed by the Prince of Wales and other distinguished guests. The Transatlantic telegraph cable had its British termination on his Valentia estates, and he evinced much public spirit and energy in connection with the successful laying of the cable. on 8 July 1880, only one month before his death, he was created the 1st Baron Valentia in the peerage of the United Kingdom.  This entitled him to sit in the UK House of Lords. Both his UK baronetcy and his hereditary Irish knighthood have inherited by his successors.

Personal life
On 11 August 1838, FitzGerald married Julia Hussey, daughter of Peter Bodkin Hussey of Farranikilla House, co. Kerry, a lineal descendant of the Norman family of Hoses, which settled on the promontory of Dingle in the thirteenth century. He and Lady Julia had four sons and seven daughters:
Mary Emily Francis FitzGerald (1863–1917), who in 1863 married Sir Capel Molyneux, 7th Baronet (died 1879) of Castle Dillon, County Armagh.
Emily FitzGerald (died 1932), unmarried.
Frances Caroline FitzGerald (died 1921), unmarried.
Katharine FitzGerald (died 1927), who in 1873 married Rev. Henry Bell, vicar of Muncaster, Cumberland.
Elizabeth Anne FitzGerald (died 1922), who in 1882 married Francis Spring Rice, 4th Baron Monteagle (1852–1937) (the brother of Thomas Spring Rice, 2rd Baron Monteagle). Their son was Charles Spring Rice, 5th Baron Monteagle (1887–1946).
Julia Emma Isabella FitzGerald (died 1936), who in 1888 married Stephen Spring Rice (1856–1902).  After Spring Rice's death, Julia married Baron Monteagle, her sister Elizabeth's widower.
Eileen Gertrude FitzGerald, who in 1886 married Brig. Gen. Edward Kaye Daubeney, son of Reverend Robert Thomas Daubeney
Sir Maurice Fitzgerald, 20th Knight of Kerry, 2nd Baronet of Valentia (1844–1916), who in 1883 married Amélie Bischoffsheim (1858–1947), daughter of Dutch banker Henri Louis Bischoffsheim (1829–1908) and granddaughter of Louis-Raphaël Bischoffsheim (1800–1873).
Robert John La Touche FitzGerald (1852–?), who married Marion Harte, eldest daughter of Mahony Harte, Esq.
Peter David FitzGerald (1855–1935), who in 1890 married Helen Mary Percy (died 1904), daughter of Major William Francis Percy
Brinsley John Hamilton FitzGerald (1859–1931), who in 1918 married Margarita (née Armstrong) Drexel.
FitzGerald was a magistrate and deputy-lieutenant for County Kerry, and was High Sheriff of Kerry in 1849, and of County Carlow in 1875. On 8 July 1880, he was created a baronet of Valentia in the County of Kerry, in the Baronetage of the United Kingdom.

Death
Peter FitzGerald died on 6 August 1880. He was succeeded in his titles and estates by his eldest son, Captain Maurice FitzGerald, who became 2nd Baronet, 20th Knight of Kerry. Captain Fitzgerald served with distinction in the Anglo-Ashanti wars, being present at the battles of Amoaful, Becquah, and Ordahau, and at the capture of Coomassie.

References

 (Ireland)

Irish knights
Peter
1808 births
1880 deaths
People from County Kerry
High Sheriffs of Kerry
Deputy Lieutenants of Kerry
19th-century Anglo-Irish people
Baronets in the Baronetage of the United Kingdom